Neha Bam is an Indian actress. She was born and raised in Kolhapur. She completed a postgraduate degree in liberation psychology. She began her acting career with Avishkar group on stage while also working as a model, beginning with print ads for pharmaceutical companies. After several years working at colleges she was offered a role in a film and, finding acting more interesting, quit her other job in order to act full-time. In Television, she had appear in many serial like Savdhaan India, Kumkum Bhagya, Sukanya Hamari Betiyan etc. In Cinema, she had worked in a number of movies like The Dirty Picture, The Lift Boy, etc

Filmography

 The Trases of Sandalwood Spanish (2015)
 Rokk Hindi
 The Dirty Picture Hindi 
 Ya Rab Hindi
 Sawariya Hindi
 Raqt Hindi 
 Kuch To Gadbad Hai Hindi 
 Jo Bolse Sau Nihal Hindi 
 Tum Ho Na Hindi 
 Chand Bujh Gaya Hindi 
 Ab Tak Chappan Hindi 
 Sandhya Hindi 
 Champion Hindi 
 Aap Mujhe Acche Lagane Lage Hindi 
 Raaz Hindi 
 Nayak Hindi 
 Kurukshetra Hindi
 Hu Tu Tu Hindi 
 Ratra Arambha Marathi
 Bindhast Marathi
 Tochi Samartha Ek Marathi
 Sanai Chaughade Marathi (2007)
 Vishwas Marathi (2009)
 Rege Marathi (2015)
 Yada Yada Hi Dharmasya Marathi (upcoming)
 Rada Rocks Marathi (2013)
 Tuzi Mazi Love Story Marathi (2014)
 Taptapadi Marathi (2014)
 Bhay Marathi (2015)
 Mantthan Marathi (2015)
 Dulha Milal Dildar Bhojpuri 
 Bairi Piya Bhojpuri
 Pinjadevali Muniya Bhojpuri
The Lift Boy (2019)
Ateet (2020) as Doctor aunty; released on ZEE5

Television

References

 Actress Neha Bam Sharing her work experice

External links
 
 

Living people
People from Kolhapur
Marathi actors
Indian film actresses
Indian television actresses
Indian soap opera actresses
Actresses in Hindi cinema
Actresses in Hindi television
Actresses in Marathi cinema
Actresses in Marathi television
Year of birth missing (living people)
20th-century Indian actresses
21st-century Indian actresses